Andrew Clifford Greenberg (born 1957) co-created Wizardry with Robert Woodhead, which was one of the first role-playing video games for a personal computer.  He was also involved with the production of the game Q-Bert and several of the later Wizardry games in the 1980s. He is a graduate of Cornell University, where he did his first work on role-playing video games. He also is a proficient tuba player.

With Rick Dutton, Walter Freitag, and Michael Massimilla he created Star Saga One: Beyond the Boundary & Star Saga: Two - The Clathran Menace, in 1988 and 1989 respectively. Both were released by Masterplay Publishing.

The name of the evil wizard in the first Wizardry game is Werdna, Andrew spelled backwards.

After working as a patent attorney with Carlton Fields, a law firm in Tampa, Florida, Andrew moved to San Francisco, California where he serves as an executive and general counsel for a renewable energy company.  Greenberg is a past Chairman of the Intellectual Property Committee for the IEEE, and has received the Institute's National Citation of Honor.

References

External links

Video game designers
Florida lawyers
American patent attorneys
1957 births
Living people
Cornell University alumni